James Frederick "Pim" Goff (May 13, 1912 – February 28, 1980) was an American football, basketball, and baseball player and coach. He was the 11th head football coach at Eastern Illinois State Teachers College—now known as Eastern Illinois University—serving for one season in 1945 season and compiling a record of 2–3–2. Goff was the head basketball coach at Millikin University in 1942–1943, at Eastern Illinois from 1944 to 1946, at Illinois State Normal University—now known as Illinois State University—from 1949 to 1957, and at Quincy College and Seminary—now known as Quincy University, compiling a career college basketball coaching record of 168–168. He was also the head baseball coach at Millikin in 1943, tallying a mark of 5–2.

Goff, whose hometown was Normal, Illinois, attended Illinois State University, where he lettered in football, tennis, basketball, baseball, and track. He also played professional baseball and professional basketball. He died in 1980 while vacationing in Tucson, Arizona.

Head coaching record

Football

References

External links
 
 

1912 births
1980 deaths
American football halfbacks
American men's basketball coaches
American men's basketball players
Baseball pitchers
Baseball players from Illinois
Basketball coaches from Illinois
Basketball players from Illinois
Baton Rouge Red Sticks players
Bloomington Bloomers players
Clarksdale Ginners players
Clinton Giants players
College men's basketball head coaches in the United States
College men's track and field athletes in the United States
Davenport Blue Sox players
Duluth Dukes players
Eastern Illinois Panthers football coaches
Eastern Illinois Panthers men's basketball coaches
Forwards (basketball)
Fulton Eagles players
Hammond Ciesar All-Americans players
Hopkinsville Hoppers players
Hot Springs Bathers players
Illinois State Redbirds baseball players
Illinois State Redbirds football players
Illinois State Redbirds men's basketball players
Illinois State Redbirds men's tennis players
Kansas City Blues players
Millikin Big Blue baseball coaches
Millikin Big Blue football coaches
Millikin Big Blue men's basketball coaches
Palestine Pals players
People from Normal, Illinois
Players of American football from Illinois
Quincy Hawks men's basketball coaches
San Antonio Missions players
Thomasville Orioles players